The 1954 Columbia Lions football team was an American football team that represented Columbia University as an independent during the 1954 college football season. 

In their 25th season under head coach Lou Little, the Lions compiled a 1–8 record, and were outscored 306 to 71. Neil Opdyke was the team captain.  

Columbia played its home games at Baker Field in Upper Manhattan, in New York City.

Schedule

References

Columbia
Columbia Lions football seasons
Columbia Lions football